Edward "Eddie" Parenti (born June 26, 1971) is a Canadian former competitive swimmer who specialized in freestyle and butterfly events.  Parenti represented Canada at the 1992 Summer Olympics in Barcelona, Spain, and finished in 26th place in the 200-metre butterfly, 27th place in the 400-metre freestyle, and ninth place with the men's 4x200-metre freestyle relay team.  He also participated in the 1996 Summer Olympics in Atlanta, Georgia.

References
 

1971 births
Living people
Canadian male butterfly swimmers
Canadian male freestyle swimmers
Olympic swimmers of Canada
Swimmers from Montreal
Swimmers at the 1992 Summer Olympics
Swimmers at the 1995 Pan American Games
Swimmers at the 1996 Summer Olympics
Commonwealth Games silver medallists for Canada
Pan American Games bronze medalists for Canada
Swimmers at the 1990 Commonwealth Games
Commonwealth Games medallists in swimming
Pan American Games medalists in swimming
Medalists at the 1995 Pan American Games
Medallists at the 1990 Commonwealth Games